Danielle Perkins (born August 30, 1982) is an American professional boxer. As an amateur she won a bronze medal at the 2018 World Championships and gold the following year.

Professional boxing career
Perkins made her professional debut on August 20, 2020, scoring a four-round unanimous decision (UD) victory against Monika Harrison at the Kronk Gym in Detroit, Michigan.

Professional boxing record

References

1982 births
Living people
AIBA Women's World Boxing Championships medalists
American women boxers
Sportspeople from Brooklyn
Heavyweight boxers
Southpaw boxers
Boxers from New York City